TAROT ("Quick-action telescope for transient objects") is a project of the European Southern Observatory (ESO) aimed at rapidly reacting to particular data from other astronomical surveying facilities to monitor for and registering fast changing astronomical objects and phenomena. The target of this particular project is so-called gamma-ray bursts (GRB).

The TAROT-South facility is a 25 cm very fast moving optical robotic telescope at the La Silla Observatory in Chile.

In addition to its own observations, an important purpose of the telescope is to find an accurate source location.  With its wide field of view, it can take an approximate location (±1°) from a gamma-ray detector and produce a location accurate to 1″ within a minute, for the benefit of follow-on observations by larger telescopes with longer reaction times.

It is a duplicate of the original TAROT telescope located at the Calern observatory, in France.

References

See also 
 Rapid Eye Mount telescope, a larger, somewhat slower companion telescope also located at La Silla.

Robotic telescopes
European Southern Observatory
Space Situational Awareness Programme
2006 establishments in Chile